Francisco Rivas Almada was the Paraguayan Minister of Industry and Commerce under President Fernando Lugo.

References

Living people
Government ministers of Paraguay
Year of birth missing (living people)
Place of birth missing (living people)
21st-century Paraguayan politicians